Johannes Leo Jozef "Jos" Schrier (born 28 March 1960 in Hilversum) is a sailor from the Netherlands, who represented his country at the 1992 Summer Olympics in Barcelona. With Mark Neeleman as helmsman, Schrier took the 4th place in the Star. In the 2000 Olympics in Sydney Schrier made his second Olympic appearance. Again in the Dutch Star with Mark Neeleman as helmsman. They took 6th place in the Star.

Professional life
 Director / owner: Chillzzout Management Advies (2013 – present) (www.chillzzout.nl)
 Director / owner: Chillzzout Beheer BV ( 2010 – present)
 Director: Stern Groep N.V. (2002–2011)
 Member Supervisory Board: RDC Datacentrum (2008–2013)
 Member Supervisory Board: ALP auto lease partners (2010–2013)
 Partner: Voetbalklappers BV (2011 – present)
 Vice President: Nederlands Platform Jeugdwedstrijdzeilen (NPJ) (2012 – Present)

Further reading

1992 Olympics (Barcelona)

2000 Olympics (Syndney)

References

1960 births
Living people
Dutch male sailors (sport)
Sailors at the 1992 Summer Olympics – Star
Sailors at the 2000 Summer Olympics – Star
Olympic sailors of the Netherlands
Sportspeople from Hilversum